The  buff-footed antechinus (Antechinus mysticus) is a species of marsupial.

References

Marsupials of Australia
Mammals described in 2012